Donald Killeen (September 14, 1923 – May 13, 1972) was an American mob boss who controlled criminal activity, primarily bookmaking, loansharking, and numbers in South Boston, during the late 1940s to the early 1970s.

Early life
Donald Killeen was born in 1923, and he was the eldest of four brothers, including Edward, George and Kenneth "Kenny" Killeen.

The Transit Cafe
Killeen owned and managed a bar called the Transit Cafe on West Broadway in South Boston. The Transit Cafe would later be taken over by James J. Bulger and managed by Winter Hill Gang mob associate Kevin Weeks. His organization included Whitey Bulger, William S. O'Sullivan, and Jack Curran. He engaged in a turf war with South Boston's Mullen Gang.

Personal life
Donald's brother George was the first brother to be murdered, found shot to death in the North End neighborhood in 1950. His murderers were never discovered. In 1971 when Kenneth chewed off the nose of Michael (Mickey) Dwyer, rival Boston gang member and former brother-in-law of Boston Police Department Commissioner Francis (Mickey) Roche, he wrapped it up with a cocktail napkin and sent it to Boston City Hospital in a cab to Dwyer to be reattached. Donald's other brother, Edward, was found shot to death in 1968; it was listed by the county coroner as an apparent suicide. In 1968 he became a father to a son.

Death
He was killed outside his home in suburban Framingham, Massachusetts, on May 13, 1972, as he was called away by an associate on his son Gregory's fourth birthday. He left the house saying he was going to fetch a newspaper but in reality was going to get his son's present, a toy fire engine, in the trunk of his 1971 Chevrolet Nova. As Donald went to fetch a gun stashed underneath the driver's seat of his car, a gunman pulled open the car door and jammed the machine gun in his face before squeezing off fifteen rounds.

Bulger was accused of the murder by longtime rumor. However, former Mullen gang member Patrick Nee stated that the murder was actually committed by Mullen enforcer Jimmy Mantville.

Aftermath
The last and youngest brother, Kenny Killeen, was jogging past a parked car with four men in it in the City Point neighborhood of Boston. the men in the car were Whitey Bulger, Stephen Flemmi and John Martorano. He said that Bulger called him over to the car and said, "It's over. You're out of business. No further warnings"—a message to not try to take over his brothers' rackets or avenge their deaths.

Further reading
English, T. J. Paddy Whacked: The Untold Story of the Irish American Gangster. New York: HarperCollins, 2005. 
Lehr, Dick; O'Neill, Gerard. Black Mass: The Irish Mob, the Boston FBI and a Devil's Deal. New York: Public Affairs, 2000. 

1923 births
1972 deaths
1972 murders in the United States
American gangsters
American crime bosses
Murdered American gangsters of Irish descent
People murdered in Massachusetts
Deaths by firearm in Massachusetts
Gangsters from Boston